The 2011 Southern Jaguars football team was an American football team that represented Southern University as a member of the West Division of the Southwestern Athletic Conference (SWAC) during the 2011 NCAA Division I FCS football season. Led by second-year head coach Stump Mitchell, the Jaguars compiled an overall record of 4–7 with a mark of 4–5 in conference play, placing fourth in the SWAC's West Division. Southern played their home games at Ace W. Mumford Stadium in Baton Rouge, Louisiana.

Schedule

References

Southern
Southern Jaguars football seasons
Southern Jaguars football